Luis Marco Aguiriano Nalda, known as Marco Aguiriano (born 27 January 1963) is a Spanish politician. He served as the 12th Secretary of State for the European Union of the Government of Spain from June 2018 to February 2020.

Biography
Born in Brussels, Aguiriano is the son of José Antonio Aguiriano, an important Socialist Party member from the Autonomous Community of the Basque Country. Aguiriano holds a degree in international relations from the University of Geneva and the Graduate Institute of International Studies and he continued his studies in Brussels, where he got a Master in European Studies in the Free University of Brussels. He speaks seven languages: Spanish (mother tongue), English, French, German, Greek, Italian and Portuguese.

It was during this time that he took contact with the European Parliament. He started there as a trainee and later assistant of the then MEP Enrique Barón, who three years later included him in his Cabinet as adviser from 1989 to 1991 after being appointed President of the European Parliament. Aguiriano was also adviser of EU Parliament President Klaus Hänsch from 1994 to 1997. From 1997 to 2004 he was the Main Advisor of the European Parliament Secretary General Cabinet, Julian Priestley.

In 2004 he started his a political career as replacing Joan Colom i Naval who had left the European parliament and became an  MEP himself, however, he did not stand as candidat for the elections to the European Parliament in May 2004 but rather assumed the office of Deputy Director of the Cabinet of the President of the European Parliament, Josep Borrell from 2004 to 2007.

In April 2010 he assumed the office of Acting Director-General for External Policies of the Union and was appointed officially as Director-General in July 2010, a position that held until June 2018.

In June 2018 he accepted the offering of the Foreign Minister, his former boss and former EU Parliament President Josep Borrell to replace Jorge Toledo Albiñana as Secretary of State for the European Union. In February 2020, the new foreign minister Arancha González Laya, appointed Juan González-Barba Pera to replace Aguiriano.

References

1963 births
Living people
MEPs for Spain 2004–2009
Spanish officials of the European Union
Secretaries of State for the European Union
Graduate Institute of International and Development Studies alumni